Coelioxys slossoni is a species of bee in the family Megachilidae.

Subspecies
These two subspecies belong to the species Coelioxys slossoni:
 Coelioxys slossoni arenicola
 Coelioxys slossoni slossoni

References

Further reading

 

slossoni
Articles created by Qbugbot
Insects described in 1902